The group of stage of 2014–15 Indian Federation Cup  took place between 28 November 2014 and 6 January 2015.

Group A

Group B

References

Group Stage